Grammangis is a genus of flowering plants from the orchid family, Orchidaceae. It contains only two known species, both endemic to Madagascar.

Grammangis ellisii (Lindl.) Rchb.f.
Grammangis spectabilis Bosser & Morat

See also 
 List of Orchidaceae genera

References 

Reichenbach, H.G. (1860) Hamburger Garten- und Blumenzeitung 16: 520.
Berg Pana, H. 2005. Handbuch der Orchideen-Namen. Dictionary of Orchid Names. Dizionario dei nomi delle orchidee. Ulmer, Stuttgart
Pridgeon, A.M., Cribb, P.J., Chase, M.C. & Rasmussen, F.N. (2009) Epidendroideae (Part two). Genera Orchidacearum 5: 112 ff. Oxford University Press.

External links 

Eulophiinae genera
Orchids of Madagascar
Eulophiinae